Judge Neilson Poe (August 11, 1809 - January 4, 1884) was an American judge for the City of Baltimore's orphan's court, (now referred to as a probate court). He was initially appointed to the court by Maryland Governor John Lee Carroll in 1878 and elected to the position in November 1879. He had the job until 1883.

He also worked as the Director of the Chesapeake and Ohio Canal, as well as a state director for the Baltimore and Ohio Railroad. He was also an editor for several newspapers, such as the Frederick Examiner, the  Federal Gazette and the Baltimore Chronicle, for which he was also the proprietor.

Neilson was a cousin of the poet, Edgar Allan Poe. His wife, Josephine E. Clemm was a half-sister of the poet's wife, Virginia Eliza Clemm Poe. However, Edgar once referred to Neilson as "the bitterest enemy he had in the world". The reason for this statement is unknown.

On October 3, 1849, Edgar Allan Poe was found in backroom of Ryan's inn and tavern, delirious. Neilson attempted to visit Edgar in the hospital and subsequently wrote several letters containing information about his cousin's death. Soon afterwards Edgar died. Edgar's hearse and headstone of white Italian marble, were paid for by Neilson.

He was the father of John P. Poe, Sr., the Attorney General of Maryland from 1891 until 1895. His grandsons consisted of the six Poe brothers, who played American football for Princeton between 1882 and 1901.

References

The Poe Shadow
Neilson Poe

See also
Death of Edgar Allan Poe
Poe brothers
John P. Poe, Sr.

1808 births
1884 deaths
Poe family (United States)
Lawyers from Baltimore